Eggstätt is a municipality in the district of Rosenheim in Bavaria in Germany.

Eggstätt is situated on a flat ridge (539 m) between a forested, undulating region and the wetland area to the northwest of Lake Chiemsee. The Eggstätt-Hemhof Lakes District contains 17 smaller and larger lakes surrounding the township.
There is evidence of human settlement in the area dating back to the Bronze Age; the name Eggstaett (“Echistat”) was first documented in the year 925 AD.

References

Rosenheim (district)